Brass Sun is a work of steampunk science fantasy. It was created by writer Ian Edginton and artist I. N. J. Culbard and is published in the British comics anthology 2000 AD, where it first appeared in 2012.

Premise
The story takes place in a full-size orrery. Wren, the young protagonist, undertakes a quest to restart the dying brass sun at the centre of a gigantic mechanical solar system containing dozens of worlds and moons, all connected via colossal spars.

Creation
Edginton got the idea for the series while speculating about full-scale versions of orreries. The character of Wren was conceived as a capable female character that young girls can relate to.

The Diamond Age, Floating Worlds and Engine Summer likely reference classic science fiction novels of the same name, by Neal Stephenson, Cecelia Holland and John Crowley, respectively. Motor Head likely references the well-known British rock band Motörhead.

Publications

Series
 "The Wheel of Worlds" (in 2000AD #1800-1811, 2012, 65 pages)
 "The Diamond Age" (in 2000AD #1850-1861, 2013, 65 pages)
 "Floating Worlds" (in 2000AD #1888-1899, 2014, 65 pages)
 "Motor Head" (in 2000AD #1950-1959, 2015, 55 pages)
 "Engine Summer" (in 2000AD #2061-2072, 2017–2018)

In 2014, the first three storylines were published by Rebellion as a six-issue limited series from May to October.

Cover art
 #1806 "World Building" by Nick Percival
 #1852 "Crawling the Walls" by I. N. J. Culbard
 #1859 "Fly-By Shooting" by I. N. J. Culbard
 #1893 "The Deep End" by I. N. J. Culbard
 #1954 "Kingslayer" by I. N. J. Culbard

Collected editions
 Brass Sun: The Wheel of Worlds (collects "The Wheel of Worlds", "The Diamond Age" and "Floating Worlds", 2014, Rebellion)

References

External links
 Brass Sun at 2000 AD Barney (not up-to-date: first two stories only)
  The 2000 AD ABC #19: Brass Sun at YouTube

2000 AD comic strips
Science fiction comics
Steampunk comics